Lilienthal Glacier is a glacier flowing west into Cayley Glacier between Pilcher Peak and Baldwin Peak, on the west coast of Graham Land, Antarctica. It was photographed by the Falkland Islands and Dependencies Aerial Survey Expedition in 1956–57, and mapped from these photos by the Falkland Islands Dependencies Survey. It was named by the UK Antarctic Place-Names Committee in 1960 for Otto Lilienthal, a German pioneer of flight in gliders.

The glacier is 979 meters above sea level.

References

External links 

 Lilienthal Glacier on USGS website
 Lilienthal Glacier on AADC website
  Lilienthal Glacier on SCAR website
 Satellite image of Lilienthal Glacier
 Lilienthal Glacier area map

Glaciers of Davis Coast
Otto Lilienthal